Glycosyltransferase-like protein LARGE1 is an enzyme that in humans is encoded by the LARGE gene.

Function 

This gene, which is one of the largest in the human genome, encodes a member of the N-acetylglucosaminyltransferase gene family. The exact function of LARGE, a golgi protein, remains uncertain. It encodes a glycosyltransferase which participates in glycosylation of alpha-dystroglycan, and may carry out the synthesis of glycoprotein and glycosphingolipid sugar chains. It may also be involved in the addition of a repeated disaccharide unit. Mutations in this gene cause MDC1D, a novel form of congenital muscular dystrophy with severe mental retardation and abnormal glycosylation of alpha-dystroglycan. Alternative splicing of this gene results in two transcript variants that encode the same protein.

LARGE may also play a role in tumor-specific genomic rearrangements. Mutations in this gene may be involved in the development and progression of meningioma through modification of ganglioside composition and other glycosylated molecules in tumor cells.

References

Further reading

External links
  GeneReviews/NCBI/NIH/UW entry on Congenital Muscular Dystrophy Overview